Augusto Ruspoli-Ottoboni, dei Principi Ruspoli (Rome, September 8, 1880 – Rome, 1912), was an Italian aristocrat and son of Mario Ruspoli and Costanza Boncompagni-Ludovisi-Ottoboni. Mario was the youngest son of Augusto Ruspoli, who was the youngest son of Alessandro Ruspoli, 4th Prince of Cerveteri. And Costanza was daughter of Marco Boncompagni Ludovisi Ottoboni, 10th Duke of Fiano.

Augusto inherited the title of his maternal grandfather, becoming the 11th Duke of Fiano. He was also Patrizio Romano, Noble of Viterbo and Orvieto and Prince of the Holy Roman Empire.

He died unmarried and without issue and was succeeded in the title by his cousin Cesare Ottoboni.

See also
Ruspoli

External links
 Papal Genealogy by George L. Williams

1880 births
1912 deaths